Mousie is an unincorporated community within Knott County, Kentucky, United States.

History
A post office called Mousie has been in operation since 1916. Mousie was the name of the first postmaster's daughter. According to one account, the girl's name was Mousie Martin.

Notable person
Bob Conley, baseball player.

References

Unincorporated communities in Knott County, Kentucky
Unincorporated communities in Kentucky
Coal towns in Kentucky